The Willimansett Bridge is a steel truss bridge over the Connecticut River located between Chicopee, Massachusetts and Holyoke, Massachusetts.  It carries Massachusetts state routes 116 and 141.

History
Prior to its construction, a "free bridge at Willamansett" was discussed at least as early as 1886, with the Commonwealth's committee on roads and bridges visiting the site in an official capacity on March 18, 1886. The bridge was built in 1891 by Richard F. Hawkins Ironworks(superstructure) and Wright Lyons and Company (substructure) with Edward S. Shaw as engineer at an original cost of $178,326.69.

The bridge received new weight restrictions in the summer of 2007.  A refurbishment project began in August 2011. The $19 million project included bridge deck replacement, sidewalk replacement, bridge rail replacement, substructure repairs, cleaning & painting of structural steel.  Girders, steel trusses and one or more of the piers will be replaced. The bridge closed to traffic during the 2.5 year planned construction but was usable by pedestrians during the project.  The original contractor went bankrupt, causing a 9-month delay.  Northern Construction took over the work.  In 2014, an additional cost $3 million was added to the project. The bridge re-opened on June 12, 2015.

See also
 List of crossings of the Connecticut River

References

External links
Official rehabilitation project page, archived

Buildings and structures in Chicopee, Massachusetts
Buildings and structures in Holyoke, Massachusetts
Truss bridges in the United States
Bridges over the Connecticut River
Bridges completed in 1892
Bridges in Hampden County, Massachusetts
Road bridges in Massachusetts
Steel bridges in the United States
1892 establishments in Massachusetts